Limnaeus, Limnaea, Limnetes or Limnagenes, i. e. inhabiting or born in a lake or marsh, is an ancient Greek surname of several divinities who were believed either to have sprung from a lake, or had their temples near a lake. Instances are, Dionysus at Athens, and Artemis at Sicyon, near Epidaurus, on the frontiers between Laconia and Messenia, near Calamae, Patrae; it is also used as a surname of nymphs that dwell in lakes or marshes.

Limnaeus or Limnaios as a personal male name:

Limnaeus, a general of Alexander the Great,  in the battle of Malli  (see Habreas)
Limnaios son of Harpalos, a land-owner; he was given estates in Chalcidice by king Lysimachus
Limnaios and Lysanias helped Rhodes after 226 BC earthquake
Limnaeus, an ambassador of Philip V of Macedon (see Cycliadas)
Saint Limnaeus, disciple of Saint Thalassius, an hermit in Syria (5th century). Theodoret records that Limnaeus had been living in this way for thirty-eight years.

Johannes Limnaeus  (Johann Wirn) (1592–1663) German professor who wrote a work entitled "Jus publicum Imperii Romano-Germanici"
Georg Limnaeus (1554–1611) German professor of mathematics  in Jena
Limnaeus is also a surname of species in zoology (i.e. Austrofundulus limnaeus, a fish, Gammarus limnaeus, an amphipod )

References

Epithets of Greek deities
Epithets of Dionysus
Epithets of Artemis
Ancient Macedonians